The Iron Gates (known in French as Défilé des Bibans or Porte de Fer) are a mountain pass in the Bibans in Algeria. They gave their name to the Biban Range.

History
An 1839 French expedition under the duc d'Orléans disregarded the clauses of the 1837 Treaty of Tafna with emir Abd el-Kader by passing through them, reigniting the war between them.

References

Mountain passes of Algeria
Atlas Mountains